Richard Jackson Books was an imprint at:
Orchard Books (1986-1996)
DK Ink (1996-1999)
Atheneum Books for Young Readers (1999-2019)